White City Stadium (Newcastle) was a greyhound racing stadium near Scotswood Bridge in Blaydon on Tyne, County Durham.

Origins 
In 1927 the Tyneside Sports Stadium Ltd Company planned to construct a stadium just south of the River Tyne at the end of the Scotswood Bridge. There was a spare plot of land where the stadium could just about squeeze into between the river and the Redheugh Branch railway line. It was the first greyhound track to open in Newcastle and the Greyhound Racing Association (GRA) also had a financial interest in the venture.

Opening 
The stadium opened on 26 May 1928 and had a large circumference of 485 yards. Brough Park would open just 28 days later whilst Gosforth did not appear until 1932 and Gateshead 1937, resulting in four rival tracks.

History 
There were two car parks situated on either side of the stadium off Chain Bridge Road with the entrance sporting some picturesque gardens. The main stand on the home straight featured a 300 feet wide 'Senior Club' upstairs with three bar lounges and glass fronted viewing above the tote hall and offices. The Senior Club could be accessed from the 3 shillings and 4 shillings 6 pence enclosures with an annual subscription of 2 shillings 6 pence. 
On the fourth bend there was a 'Junior Club' within the two shillings enclosure that also included two stands, totalisator and snack bar. The paddock and racing kennels were situated near the first bend with the resident and isolation kennels set further back on the second bend.

It was described as a very good galloping track with long 100 yard straights and easy bends with a 550-yard distance in one circuit behind an 'Inside Sumner' hare system. By 1940 the distances were established as 325, 525, 550 and 700 yards and were verified with a racecard notice by the NGRC's official measurer Mr G E Marshall.  As the war approached business remained steady under the leadership of General Manager Mr J A Melville and the Racing Manager Mr T Greggs.

Closure 
Despite excellent facilities and a profitable business problems arose after the war, the totalisator turnover was a healthy £1,106,242 in 1946 at its peak, lowering to £606,005 one year later. The problems came about because of the controversial government taxation of greyhound racing towards the end of the 1940s. It was in 1951 that Managing Director Mr Whatley reported that tote receipts were £75,000 of which £47,000 was taken out by taxation. The government policy continued to make matters difficult for greyhound racing totalisators with close scrutiny and restrictions of gambling still considered in the interests of the general public.

The net result for White City was the closure of the track on 26 May 1951, exactly 23 years after it opened. Tyneside lost its first greyhound track and the site became a depot and then eventually industrial units on Toll Bridge Road.

References

Defunct greyhound racing venues in the United Kingdom